Qazim Dërvishi Sports Palace is a multi-use sports arena in Shkodër, Albania. It is the owned and operated by the Municipality of Shkodër and it is the home of the multidisciplinary KS Vllaznia. It is named after Qazim Dervishi, who was a sportsman from Shkodër.

References

Indoor arenas in Albania
Basketball venues in Albania
Sports venues in Albania
Indoor track and field venues
Buildings and structures in Shkodër
1969 establishments in Albania
Sports venues completed in 1969